Dmowski's Line was a proposed border of Poland after World War I. It was proposed by the Polish delegation at the Paris Peace Conference of 1919 and it was named after Roman Dmowski, Polish foreign minister. Poland wanted Upper Silesia, Pomerelia including Danzig, Warmia and Masuria, all of Lithuania, and western parts of Belarus, Polesia, Volhynia and Podolia.

Boundary line
The boundary line to the east was Polish by the notes from the Polish Delegation as follows:

 

This proposal was rejected, and later withdrawn by the author, Roman Dmowski, who, during the negotiations ending the Polish-Bolshevik war, spoke out against the inclusion of Minsk. He explained the desire to build a country without ethnic minorities; the de facto theme was the desire to prevent the concept of federation (Międzymorze) of Jozef Pilsudski, even to a limited extent. Consequently, in the Treaty of Riga the Polish-Soviet border was demarcated in the distance of about 30 km to the west and north of Minsk. Polish territory according to Dmowski's proposal was supposed to be equal to 447,000 km2.

See also
 Intermarium, in Polish, Międzymorze
 Curzon Line
 Foch Line

References

External links 
 Polish Note on Peace Conference (western borders)
 Polish Note on Peace Conference (eastern borders)

Second Polish Republic
Borders of Poland
Western Belorussia (1918–1939)
Eponymous border lines
Intermarium